Mark Duffy is an Irish banker.

In 1981 he joined ICC Bank as a graduate trainee before taking up a position at 3i, a venture capital company. When 3i was sold to Anglo Irish Bank in 1987, he was offered a role with the new owner. He was approached by Bank of Scotland, who owned part of 3i at the time, to become CEO aged 31 to rescue their ailing Equity bank in 1992. He successfully grew this entity, acquiring his previous employer ICC along the way, into a €37bn full service bank successfully challenging the Irish banks for the first time.

After 17 years as CEO, he resigned from the Bank of Scotland (Ireland) in 2008 at the age of 51. He was replaced by his former COO Joe Higgins who along with other colleagues established the very successful Certus. He moved abroad, established a private not-for-profit investment vehicle backed by his Swedish's wife's family aimed at rehabilitating drug use. His wife is one of the Aastrup family.

He has also been associated with a range of new start up vehicles, particularity Svenska Fonden focussed on financial services. Zug, in Switzerland, appears to be his family base. He was also rumoured in June 2018 to be "eyeing up an the Irish residential lending market" potentially as a repeat of his work with Bank of Scotland (Ireland).

References

Irish chief executives
Living people
Year of birth missing (living people)